Kasganj Assembly constituency is  one of the 403 constituencies of the Uttar Pradesh Legislative Assembly,  India. It is a part of the Etah district and one of  the five assembly constituencies in the Etah Lok Sabha constituency. First election in this assembly constituency was held in 1952 after the "DPACO (1951)" (delimitation order) was passed in 1951. After the "Delimitation of Parliamentary and Assembly Constituencies Order" was passed in 2008, the constituency was assigned identification number 100.

Wards  / Areas
Extent  of Kasganj Assembly constituency is KCs Nameni, Bilram, Soron, Soron MB,  Kasganj MB & Bilram NP of Kasganj Tehsil.

Members of the Legislative Assembly

Election results

2022

2012
16th Vidhan Sabha: 2012 Elections

See also
Etah district
Etah Lok Sabha constituency
Sixteenth Legislative Assembly of Uttar Pradesh
Uttar Pradesh Legislative Assembly
Vidhan Bhawan

References

External links
 

Assembly constituencies of Uttar Pradesh
Etah district
Constituencies established in 1951
Kasganj